A Little Love Never Hurts is a South Korean weekend television drama series starring Hong Soo-hyun, Lee Sang-yeob, Shin Da-eun and Seo Ji-seok. It aired on MBC from September 28, 2013 to March 30, 2014 on Saturdays and Sundays at 20:40 for 50 episodes.

Cast
Hong Soo-hyun as Song Mi-joo
Lee Sang-yeob as Jung Jae-min
Shin Da-eun as Eun Ha-kyung
Seo Ji-seok as Eun Ha-rim
Park Geun-hyung as Jung Hyun-soo
Cha Hwa-yeon as Hong Soon-ae
Choi Su-rin as Shin Soo-jung
Yoo Ho-jeong as Jung Yoo-jin
Kim Seung-soo as Kang Sung-hoon
Han Go-eun as Jung Yoo-ra
Kang Seok-woo as Song Ho-seob
Yu Ji-in as Lee Hye-sin
Nam Bo-ra as Song Eun-joo
Yoon Park as Kim Joon-sung
Kim Na-woon as Lee Yeon-hee
Choi Jung-woo as Eun Hee-jae
Jung Jae-soon as Eun Hee-ja
Seo Dong-won as Song Byung-joo
Oh Na-ra as Kim Ji-young
Cho Yeon-woo as Jang Yoon-chul

References

External links
  
 

MBC TV television dramas
2013 South Korean television series debuts
2014 South Korean television series endings
Korean-language television shows
South Korean romance television series
Television series by IWill Media